Auronzo di Cadore is a comune (municipality) in the province of Belluno (Cadore) in the Italian region of Veneto, located about  north of Venice and about  northeast of Belluno. While Auronzo is geographically only  from the Austrian border, it is roughly  via paved road due to the mountainous terrain. 

The municipality of Auronzo di Cadore includes the mountain group of the Tre Cime di Lavaredo and Lake Misurina. The river Ansiei is dammed to make  Santa Caterina Lake, which borders the town. The main road through Auronzo is route SR48

Twin towns / Sister cities 
  Lipari, Italy
  Ilópolis, Brazil

References

External links
Auronzo di Cadore history and guide

Cities and towns in Veneto